Maesteg (Ewenny Road) railway station is one of two railway stations that serve the town of Maesteg in Wales. It is located adjacent to the Ewenny Road Industrial Estate to the south of Maesteg on the Maesteg Line from Cardiff via Bridgend. The other station, which is the terminus of the Maesteg Line, is named .

History

Passenger services were restored to the Maesteg Line in 1992 by British Rail and Mid Glamorgan County Council. Both stations were brand new additions and did not replace a station previously in existence prior to the 1970 passenger service withdrawal. The platform was lengthened in 2008 to allow four-car trains to operate busier services. This was funded by the Welsh Assembly Government and the European Union.

Service
Services are operated by Transport for Wales Rail Services as part of the Valley Lines network for local services.

References

External links 

Railway stations in Bridgend County Borough
DfT Category F2 stations
Railway stations opened by British Rail
Railway stations in Great Britain opened in 1992
Railway stations served by Transport for Wales Rail
Maesteg